The 1946 Texas Tech Red Raiders football team was an American football team that represented Texas Tech University in the Border Conference during the 1946 college football season. In their sixth season under head coach Dell Morgan, the Red Raiders compiled an 8–3 record (3–1 against Border Conference opponents), finished in second place in the conference, and outscored all opponents by a total of 148 to 116. The team played home games at Tech Field in Lubbock, Texas.

Schedule

After the season

The 1947 NFL Draft was held on December 16, 1946. The following Red Raiders were selected.

References

Texas Tech
Texas Tech Red Raiders football seasons
Texas Tech Red Raiders football